Owanyilla Railway Station is a closed railway station on the North Coast railway line in Queensland. It was built to service the pine chip factory directly across the road. Nothing is left of the railway station.

Pine Chip Factory
Woodchip trains to Gladstone originate at a balloon loop at the Canterwood Pine Chip facility just east of the station site, and joins the North Coast Line just north of the station site. The factory was built in 1994, as was the railway station. However, it became clear early on that there was very little patronage to the pine chip factory so the station was shut down and dismantled.

References

Disused railway stations in Queensland
North Coast railway line, Queensland